The Student of Prague is a 1926 German Expressionist silent film by actor and filmmaker Henrik Galeen

Plot
In the year 1820, Balduin is a student at a university in Prague. At a student-led outing to a country inn, Balduin encounters the figure Scapinelli who offers him money "for very low interest." Balduin believes him to be a loan shark and ignores him to go engage in a fencing match with another student.

After the match, the viewer sees Scapinelli on a cliffside, watching a young woman (later revealed to be Margit, the daughter of a count) on horseback who is participating in a boar-hunt. He manipulates the situation such that the animals run amok and head towards the inn. Margit's horse runs away with her and Balduin catches her when she falls off. As a reward, she gives Balduin a crucifix which has fallen from her neck  and later he receives an invitation to the house of her father, Count Schwarzenberg. There he becomes aware of his own poverty in comparison to Margit's fiancé, who is a baron.

Later that night, Scapinelli again comes for Balduin and makes an offer. Balduin signs a contract stipulating that Scapinelli can have anything in the room he wants in return for 600,000 florin. Balduin signs and Scapinelli takes out a small bag and proceeds to pour the entirety of the 600,000 onto the table. Scapinelli then takes his part: Balduin's reflection.

The scene then shifts to show the new lifestyle that Balduin is leading with his newfound fortune. His happiness does not last long, because his reflection, free of the mirror, runs amok, causing havoc around town, which is blamed on Balduin. Balduin, in his final confrontation, shoots his reflection. This results in his own death. The movie closes as it opens: with a shot of Balduin's grave, upon which is inscribed "Here lies Balduin. He fought the devil and lost".

Cast
 Conrad Veidt as Balduin, The Student
 Werner Krauss as Scapinelli
 Elizza La Porta as Lyduschka, a flowergirl
 Agnes Esterhazy as Margit von Schwarzenberg
 Fritz Alberti as Count of Schwarzenberg, Margit's Vater
 Ferdinand von Alten as Baron of Waldis, Margit's fiancé
 Erich Kober as Student
 Max Maximilian as Student
 Sylvia Torf
 Marian Alma
 Horst Wessel extra in some scenes

Production
It is considered as Galeen's most important film since The Golem (1915) and is regarded as his magnum opus.

The film's screenplay was written by Galeen and Hanns Heinz Ewers and was influenced by the story of Faust. The film had previously been made as The Student of Prague.

It was shot at the Staaken Studios in Berlin. Among the crew was designer Hermann Warm; cinematographer Günther Krampf; and the actors Werner Krauss, Conrad Veidt, Dagny Servaes, Leni Riefenstahl and Elizza La Porta. Der Student von Prag made La Porta a well-known actress. The film featured impressive special effects for its time, especially the finale in which the lead character is forced to confront his other half, with seamlessly executed split screen technology.

Release
The Student of Prague was shown in Berlin on 25 October 1926. The film was remade as a sound film in 1935, directed by Arthur Robinson.

Reception
From retrospective reviews, Troy Howarth wrote in his book  Tome of Terror that the film was a "marked improvement" over the 1913 version of the film which was "creaky and antiquated by comparison"

References

External links 
 
 

1926 films
1926 horror films
1920s historical horror films
1920s historical fantasy films
German historical horror films
German historical fantasy films
German black-and-white films
Films of the Weimar Republic
German silent feature films
Films directed by Henrik Galeen
German Expressionist films
Films based on works by Hanns Heinz Ewers
Films based on works by Alfred de Musset
Films based on works by Edgar Allan Poe
Films set in Prague
Films set in 1820
Remakes of German films
Films shot at Staaken Studios
Silent horror films
1920s German films
1920s German-language films